Herbert Dixon Asquith (11 March 1881 – 5 August 1947) was an English poet, novelist, and lawyer. Nicknamed "Beb" by his family, he was the second son of H. H. Asquith, British Prime Minister, with whom he is sometimes confused, and the younger brother of Raymond Asquith.

Asquith was greatly affected by his service with the Royal Artillery in World War I. His poems included "The Volunteer" and "The Fallen Subaltern", the latter being a tribute to fallen soldiers. His poem "Soldiers at Peace" was set to music by Ina Boyle. His novels include the best-selling Young Orland (set during and after the First World War), Wind's End, Mary Dallon, and Roon.

In 1910, he married Lady Cynthia Charteris, who was also a writer. She was the eldest daughter of Hugo Charteris, 11th Earl of Wemyss, and his wife, Mary Constance Wyndham. They had three sons.

References

External links

 Profile

1881 births
1947 deaths
Military personnel from London
English barristers
Presidents of the Oxford Union
Younger sons of earls
Children of prime ministers of the United Kingdom
British Army personnel of World War I
Royal Artillery officers
Herbert Asquith
English World War I poets
20th-century English male writers
People from Hampstead
20th-century English poets
20th-century English novelists
English male poets
English male novelists
20th-century English lawyers
Children of H. H. Asquith